Steffi Graf and Gabriela Sabatini were the defending champions but only Sabatini competed that year with Betsy Nagelsen.

Nagelsen and Sabatini lost in the quarterfinals to Katrina Adams and Zina Garrison.

Jana Novotná and Helena Suková won in the final 7–6 (7–5), 6–4 against Gigi Fernández and Lori McNeil.

Seeds
Champion seeds are indicated in bold text while text in italics indicates the round in which those seeds were eliminated.

Draw

Finals

Top half

Section 1

Section 2

Bottom half

Section 3

Section 4

References
 1989 Lipton International Players Championships Women's Doubles Draw

Women's Doubles